Shahba Mall is a defunct shopping mall in Aleppo, Syria, and was the largest shopping mall in Syria prior to its destruction during the Syrian civil war. Located in northern Aleppo, the mall consists of  area of building that consists of fashion stores, boutiques, electronics stores, supermarket, restaurants, cafes, an indoor amusement park, a carting circuit, cinema and a four-star hotel with 250 guestrooms. The main anchors inside this mall were Carrefour and Virgin Megastores.

The mall was permanently closed when the mall was damaged during the Syrian civil war on October 16, 2014.

History

Pre-Syrian civil war era
Shahba Mall was one of the first project which was developed by Syrian Jordanian Company for Tourism and Real Estate Investment (SJC) and had opened in the final quarter of 2009. This project had included a 4-star hotel with 250 rooms, a seven-storey shopping mall, eight screen cinema, a business center, and 36 restaurants and cafes. The mall was located in northern Aleppo which is close to motorway that links to Gaziantep, Turkey. The construction of this mall had cost around US $ 70 million and was the largest shopping mall in Syria. Both Carrefour and Virgin Megastores were to be anchors inside the mall.

Destruction and aftermath
The mall was damaged during the Syrian civil war clashes which caused the mall to be permanently closed on October 16, 2014. Syrian activists believed that the bombing of the mall was done by pro-government airforces.

According to a 2015 article in the Guardian, the mall had served as a prison while it was under the control of the Islamic State of Iraq and the Levant.

References

External links
 

Shopping malls in Syria
Buildings and structures in Aleppo
Buildings and structures completed in 2009
Shopping malls established in 2009
Shopping malls disestablished in 2014
Defunct shopping malls
2009 establishments in Syria
2014 disestablishments in Syria
Attacks on shopping malls
Ruins in Syria
Demolished buildings and structures in Syria